Isle of Wight Railway Company v Tahourdin (1884) LR 25 Ch D 320 is a UK company law case on removing directors under the old Companies Clauses Act 1845. In the modern Companies Act 2006, section 168 allows shareholders to remove of directors by a majority vote on reasonable notice, regardless of what the company constitution says. Before 1945, removal of directors depended on the constitution, however this case contains some useful guidance on how to properly construe the provisions of a constitution.

Facts
The shareholders of the Isle of Wight Railway Co instructed the board of directors to call a meeting so they could (1) appoint a meeting to investigate and potentially rearrange the company's management, and also (2) decide whether to remove the present directors and elect new ones. The directors called a meeting “for the purpose of considering and determining upon a demand of the requisitionists for the appointment of a committee to inquire into the working and general management of the company and the means of reducing the working expenses.” But they did not allow the meeting to concern whether they would be dismissed. Disgruntled shareholders, including Mr Graham Tahourdin, boycotted the meeting, and issued their own notice to call a meeting to remove the directors under the Companies Clauses Act 1845, section 70. The directors brought the action to restrain the meeting.

Judgment

High Court
Kay J held that the first part of the original meeting request was illegal where it went beyond merely appointing a committee, because that could result in transferring power away from the directors that was properly fixed under the constitution. The second part was too vague, did not "fully express the object of the meeting" and the directors had no power to call such a meeting, and so the shareholders' power under CCA 1845 s 70 had not arisen. Therefore, he granted the injunction. Mr Tahourdin appealed.

Court of Appeal
The Court of Appeal unanimously overturned Kay J's decision and held that the meeting could be called because the notice about voting on removal of "any of the directors" was clear enough, and the Companies Clauses Act 1845 section 91 gave the general meeting power to remove directors. The general meeting can always fill up board vacancies if all directors are removed and the directors do not exercise their power under section 89, and so the directors were bound to send out the notice of the shareholders' proposal. Moreover, the first part of the shareholders' proposal was not illegal, because activities beyond merely appointing a committee could be done in a way that was not ultra vires.

Cotton LJ's opinion, on the issues of when how a meeting should be called and director removal,

Lindley LJ then delivered his judgment, concurring.

Fry LJ gave a concurring opinion.

See also

UK company law
AG of Belize v Belize Telecom Ltd
Imperial Hydropathic Hotel Co, Blackpool v Hampson (1882) 23 Ch D 1
Andrews v Gas Meter Company (1884) LR 25 Ch D 320

Notes

References

United Kingdom company case law
1883 in case law
1883 in British law
Court of Appeal (England and Wales) cases
Railway litigation in 1883